Agametrus is a genus of beetles in the family Dytiscidae, containing the following species:

 Agametrus boliviensis Régimbart, 1899
 Agametrus humilis Sharp, 1882
 Agametrus labratus Sharp, 1882
 Agametrus monticola (Guignot, 1958)
 Agametrus nitens Sharp, 1887
 Agametrus peruvianus (Laporte, 1835)
 Agametrus rotundatus Brinck, 1948

References

Dytiscidae genera